Julia Sanchez Parma (born 14 December 1990) is an Argentine racing cyclist. She finished on the podium in the Argentine National Road Race Championships every year from 2013 to 2015, winning the race in 2015.

See also
 List of 2015 UCI Women's Teams and riders

References

External links

1990 births
Living people
Argentine female cyclists
Place of birth missing (living people)
21st-century Argentine women